Solban (also, Tsolban) is a village in the Balakan Rayon of Azerbaijan. The village forms part of the municipality of Mahamalar.

References 

Populated places in Balakan District